Gadde is both a given name and surname. Notable people with the name include:

 Gadde Rajendra Prasad (born 1956), Indian film actor
 Gadde Ramamohan, Indian politician
 Lars-Erik Gadde (born 1945), Swedish business theorist
 Sindhura Gadde (born 1984), Indian beauty pageant
 Vijaya Gadde (born 1974), former Twitter policy head

Telugu-language surnames